The 10th Daytime Emmy Awards were held on Wednesday, June 8, 1983, to commemorate excellence in daytime programming from the previous year (1982). Unlike previous years, the ceremony was not telecast, although NBC had the option to do so.

Winners in each category are in bold.

Outstanding Daytime Drama Series

All My Children
Days of Our Lives
General Hospital
One Life to Live
The Young and the Restless

Outstanding Actor in a Daytime Drama Series

Peter Bergman (Cliff Warner, All My Children)
James Mitchell (Palmer Cortlandt, All My Children)
Stuart Damon (Alan Quartermaine, General Hospital)
Anthony Geary (Luke Spencer, General Hospital)
Robert S. Woods (Bo Buchanan, One Life to Live)

Outstanding Actress in a Daytime Drama Series

Susan Lucci (Erica Kane, All My Children)
Dorothy Lyman (Opal Cortlandt, All My Children)
Leslie Charleson (Monica Quartermaine, General Hospital)
Erika Slezak (Victoria Lord, One Life to Live)
Robin Strasser (Dorian Lord, One Life to Live)

Outstanding Supporting Actor in a Daytime Drama Series

Darnell Williams (Jesse Hubbard, All My Children)
Howard E. Rollins, Jr. (Ed Hardy, Another World)
David Lewis (Edward Quartermaine, General Hospital)
John Stamos (Blackie Parrish, General Hospital)
Anthony D. Call (Herb Callison, One Life to Live)
Al Freeman, Jr. (Ed Hall, One Life to Live)

Outstanding Supporting Actress in a Daytime Drama Series

Kim Delaney (Jenny Gardner, All My Children)
Eileen Herlie (Myrtle Fargate, All My Children)
Marcy Walker (Liza Colby, All My Children)
Robin Mattson (Heather Webber, General Hospital)
Brynn Thayer (Jenny Wolek, One Life to Live)
Louise Shaffer (Rae Woodward, Ryan's Hope)

Outstanding Daytime Drama Series Writing
 All My Children General Hospital One Life to Live Ryan's HopeOutstanding Daytime Drama Series Directing
 All My Children General Hospital One Life to LiveOutstanding Children's Entertainment Special

ABC Afterschool Specials - The Woman Who Willed a Miracle
     
  Dick Clark (executive producer)
  Sharron Miller (producer)

Outstanding Performer in Children's Programing

Cloris Leachman - ABC Afterschool Specials - The Woman Who Willed a MiracleOutstanding Individual Direction in Children's Programming

 Sharron Miller - ABC Afterschool Specials - The Woman Who Willed a MiracleOutstanding Game ShowThe $25,000 Pyramid - A Bob-Sande Stewart Production for CBSThe Price Is Right - A Mark Goodson Production for CBSFamily Feud - A Mark Goodson Production for ABC (Syn. by Viacom)

Outstanding Game Show Host or Hostess
Betty White (Just Men!)
Dick Clark (The $25,000 Pyramid)
Richard Dawson (Family Feud'')

Outstanding Children's Entertainment Series (Tie)
William Hanna, Joseph Barbera and Gerard Baldwin (The Smurfs)
Robert Keeshan and Jim Hirschfeld (Captain Kangaroo)

External links

010
D